Cégep de Saint-Laurent is a public French-language college located in the Saint-Laurent borough in Montreal, Quebec, Canada. It is a few doors south of the English-language public college Vanier College.

History
The college traces its origins to the merger of several institutions which became public ones in 1967, when the Quebec system of CEGEPs was created.

Programs
The college offers two types of programs: pre-university and technical. The pre-university programs, which take two years to complete, cover the subject matters which roughly correspond to the additional year of high school given elsewhere in Canada in preparation for a chosen field in university. The technical programs, which take three years to complete, applies to students who wish to be career-ready; however, many students choose to pursue a university degree. In addition, the Continuing Education Centre offers a wide variety of credit courses and programs with flexible scheduling.

Pre-university programs:
Drama arts
Visual arts
Cinema and communication
Dance
Languages
Letters
Music
Science
Health science
Pure and applied science
Medical biology
Social science

Usually, pre-university programs require four semesters (two years) to complete.

Double DEC programs:
Science and visual arts
Science and music
Science and dance
Science and letters
Social science and visual arts
Social science and dance
Social science and music
Social science and letters
Music and letters

Usually, Double DEC programs, which are considered special pre-university programs, require six semesters (three years) to complete.

Technical/Career programs:
Water sanitation technology
Environment, health, and safety
Nursing
Wildlife management technology
Community recreation technology
Mechanical engineering technology
Professional music and song technology
Architecture technology
Electronics technology

Usually, technical and career programs require six semesters (three years) to complete.

Partnerships
Vanier College, which instructs students with general and technical programs, is affiliated with the Association of Canadian Community Colleges (ACCC), and Canadian Colleges Athletic Association (CCAA).

Athletics
The college participates in the Canadian Colleges Athletic Association (CCAA) and its athletic teams are known as les Patriotes du cégep de Saint-Laurent, often shortened to Pats. The school maintains intercollegiate teams in men's ice hockey (Division I & II), women's ice hockey, men's and women's flag football, men's and women's soccer, and women's volleyball, men and woman's basket ball which compete in the Réseau du Sport Étudiant du Québec (RSEQ) Collégial.

See also
List of colleges in Quebec
Higher education in Quebec
St. Lawrence College, Ontario

References

External links
 Cégep Saint-Laurent website 
 Cégep Saint-Laurent professors union  (Syndicat des professeurs du cégep de Saint-Laurent)

Saint-Laurent
Educational institutions established in 1847
Universities and colleges in Montreal
Colleges in Quebec
Saint-Laurent, Quebec
1847 establishments in Canada